Servant of God Léo Tarcísio Gonçalves Pereira, SCJ (Delfim Moreira, state of Minas Gerais, October 9, 1961 – São Paulo, January 4, 2007), better known as Father Léo, was a Brazilian priest of the Congregation of Priests of the Sacred Heart of Jesus (Dehonian).

Biography 
Son of Joaquim Mendes and Maria Nazaré.

He joined the Catholic Charismatic Renewal (CCR) in 1983 and, on October 12, 1995, founded the Bethânia Community, which today has more than thirty members and five houses throughout Brazil, which aim to welcome and offer treatment to drug addicts, alcoholics and HIV carriers, as well as abandoned minors.

In 2002 he was given the title of honorific citizen of Curitiba, state of Paraná.

Father Léo not only was a priest and preacher, but also a singer, composer, presenter and writer. He had a Conservative mind - a preeminent Catholic voice among Conservatism in Brazil - but an informal communication style.

Cancer 
In April 2006, Father Léo began a cancer treatment he had and, even weakened, was present at the event "Hosana Brasil 2006", of the Canção Nova Community, in December, much downplayed by the treatment.

Death 
On January 4, 2007, he died at the Hospital das Clínicas in São Paulo, victim of a generalized infection as a result of an incurable cancer in the lymphatic system (lymphoma).

Canonization process 
He is a Servant of God.

Beatification 
In 2020 it was announced that his beatification process started.

References 
21st-century Brazilian Roman Catholic priests
1961 births
2007 deaths

Brazilian Servants of God